Gujranwala is a city in the Punjab province of Pakistan.

Gujranwala may also refer to:

 Gujranwala Division, a third-tier administrative subdivision in Punjab, Pakistan 
 Gujranwala District, a district in Punjab, Pakistan encompassing the city of Gujranwala and surrounding areas
 Gujranwala Cantonment, a military cantonment in Gujranwala
 Gujranwala cricket team

See also